Rob Winger (born 1974) is an Ontario-born poet and educator. Winger grew up in Springvale, Ontario, and has lived in Toronto, Sackville, New Brunswick, South Korea, Bangkok, Thailand, Guelph, Ontario, and Ottawa, Ontario. Winger now lives with his family in Port Perry, Ontario. He has been an assistant professor in the Department of English at Trent University since 2013.

Education
Winger received a B.A. in English & fine arts from Mount Allison University in 1997, a B.Ed. from the University of Ottawa in 2001, an MA in English literature from the University of Guelph in 2002, and a PhD on the poet John Thompson from Carleton University in 2009. Winger was a postdoctoral fellow at McMaster University from 2011 to 2013.

Works
Winger's first collection of poems about famed photographer Eadweard Muybridge, entitled Muybridge's Horse, won the 2003 CBC Literary Award for poetry. Published by Nightwood Editions in 2007, the final book, Muybridge's Horse: a poem in three phases, was nominated for the 2007 Governor General's Award, 2007 Trillium Book Award for Poetry,  2007 Ottawa Book Award, and was named a Globe and Mail Best Book for 2007.  Selections from the book have been translated into Japanese by Motoyuki Shibata. Winger is also the recipient of several grants from the Ontario Arts Council and the Canada Council for the Arts. His second and third volumes of poems - The Chimney Stone (2010), which was written in conjunction with his doctoral thesis, and Old Hat (2014) - were also published by Nightwood Editions. His fourth collection is It Doesn't Matter What We Meant (McClelland & Stewart, 2021).

Notes

1974 births
Living people
21st-century Canadian poets
Writers from Ontario
Canadian male poets
21st-century Canadian male writers
People from Scugog
Place of birth missing (living people)